These are the official results of the Men's pole vault event at the 1986 European Championships in Stuttgart, West Germany, held at Neckarstadion on 27 and 29 August 1986.

Medalists

Results

Qualification
27 August

Final
29 August

Participation
According to an unofficial count, 20 athletes from 10 countries participated in the event.

 (1)
 (3)
 (2)
 (2)
 (3)
 (1)
 (3)
 (2)
 (1)
 (2)

See also
 1982 Men's European Championships Pole Vault (Athens)
 1983 Men's World Championships Pole Vault (Helsinki)
 1984 Men's Olympic Pole Vault (Los Angeles)
 1987 Men's World Championships Pole Vault (Rome)
 1988 Men's Olympic Pole Vault (Seoul)
 1990 Men's European Championships Pole Vault (Split)

References
Citations

Bibliography
 Results

Pole vault
Pole vault at the European Athletics Championships